Centrolepis caespitosa is a species of plant in the Restionaceae family and is found in Western Australia.

It blooms between October and December.

It is found on salt flats and in wet areas in the South West and Great Southern regions of Western Australia where it grows in sandy-clay soils.

References

caespitosa
Plants described in 1980
Flora of Western Australia
Poales of Australia